Blaesospira is a genus of land snails with an operculum, terrestrial gastropod mollusks in the family Pomatiidae.

Species 
Species within the genus Blaesospira include:
Blaesospira echinus (Wright in Pfeiffer, 1864) - type species
Blaesospira hortensiae Jaume, 1984

References 

Pomatiidae